Don Juan is a 1955 Austrian musical film directed by Walter Kolm-Veltée and starring Cesare Danova, Josef Meinrad and Evelyn Cormand. It is an adaptation of the 1787 Mozart opera Don Giovanni.

The film was shot in the Soviet-controlled Rosenhügel Studios in Vienna.

Cast
 Cesare Danova as Don Giovanni  
 Josef Meinrad as Leporello  
 Evelyn Cormand as Zerlina 
 Hans von Borsody as Masetto  
 Lotte Tobisch as Donna Elvira  
 Jean Vinci as Don Ottavio  
 Marianne Schönauer as Donna Anna  
 Fred Hennings as Commendatore  
 Senta Wengraf as Elvira's Maid 
 Walter Berry as Masetto (singing voice)  
 Anny Felbermayer as Zerlina / Donna Anna (singing voice)  
 Gottlob Frick as Commendatore (singing voice)  
 Helmut Krauss
 Hanna Löser as Donna Elvira (singing voice)  
 Hugo Meyer-Welfing as Don Ottavio (singing voice)  
 Alfred Poell as Don Giovanni (singing voice)  
 Harald Progelhof as Leporello (singing voice)

References

Bibliography 
 Davidson, John & Hake, Sabine. Framing the Fifties: Cinema in a Divided Germany. Berghahn Books, 2007.

External links 
 

1955 films
Austrian musical films
1955 musical films
1950s German-language films
Films directed by Walter Kolm-Veltée
Films shot at Rosenhügel Studios
Films based on Don Giovanni
Opera films